The parish of Saint Joseph is a parish of Barbados on the eastern side of the island.  The parish is home to two of the more notable botanic gardens in the country - Flower Forest and Andromeda Gardens.  Parts of St. Joseph are also referred to as the Scotland District, a reference to the appearance of the landscape.

One of the highest points in the island is Chimborazo in Saint Joseph.
Saint Joseph is also the home of the "Soup Bowl" where international surfing competitions are held.

Geography

Populated places
The parish contains the following towns, villages, localities, settlements, communities and hamlets:

Parishes bordering Saint Joseph
Saint Andrew - North
Saint George - South
Saint John - Southeast
Saint Thomas - West

References

External links 
 
 

 
Parishes of Barbados